Jasmina Kajtazovič (born 26 February 1991) is a retired Slovenian-born Bosnian tennis player.

In her career, she won one singles title and five doubles titles on the ITF Circuit. On 15 September 2008, she reached her best singles ranking of world No. 518. On 20 June 2011, she peaked at No. 516 in the doubles rankings.

Playing for Bosnia and Herzegovina Fed Cup team, Kajtazovič has a win–loss record of 2–2.

ITF finals

Singles (1–3)

Doubles (5–1)

Fed Cup participation

Singles (1–0)

Doubles (1–2)

References

External links
 
 
 

1991 births
Living people
Sportspeople from Novo Mesto
Bosnia and Herzegovina female tennis players
Slovenian female tennis players